Widdrington may refer to:

Places
Widdrington, Northumberland, place in Northumberland, England
Widdrington railway station, railway station in Northumberland, England
Widdrington Station and Stobswood, place in Northumberland, England

People
Widdrington family, Barons and Baronets
Widdrington (name), surname (another disambiguation page)